Dance of the Dead may refer to:

 Danse Macabre, a late-medieval allegory on the universality of death
 Dance of the Dead (film), a 2008 American horror film
 Dance of the Dead (novel), a Dungeons & Dragons tie-in novel
 "Dance of the Dead" (Masters of Horror), an episode of the TV series Masters of Horror
 "Dance of the Dead", a 1954 short story by Richard Matheson; basis for the TV episode
 "Dance of the Dead" (The Prisoner), an episode of the TV series The Prisoner
 The Dance of the Dead, a Bernice Summerfield audio drama, based on the TV series Doctor Who

See also
 Bon Odori, a Japanese traditional dance welcoming the spirits of the dead
 La danse des morts, an oratorio by Arthur Honegger
 Dance Hall of the Dead, a novel by Tony Hillerman
 Dance of Death (disambiguation)
 Danse Macabre (disambiguation)
 Totentanz (disambiguation)